Scott Samuel "Scooter" Braun (born June 18, 1981) is an American record executive, talent agent, and entrepreneur. Known as the manager for artists such as Ariana Grande, Justin Bieber, J Balvin, Demi Lovato, The Kid Laroi and other artists, he is the founder of SB Projects, Schoolboy Records and Ithaca Ventures, co-founder of TQ Ventures, Mythos Studios, and RBMG Records, and co-owner of esports team 100 Thieves.

Early life
Braun was born in New York City to Conservative Jewish parents, Ervin and Susan (née Schlussel) Braun. Ervin's parents lived in Hungary until 1956, when they immigrated to the United States. Ervin grew up in Queens, and became a dentist and high-school basketball coach; Susan Schlussel Braun was an orthodontist. After the couple married, they settled in Cos Cob, Connecticut.

Braun has four siblings. He attended Greenwich High School where he was elected class president.

Braun attended Emory University in Atlanta where he played college basketball until his sophomore year. After Jermaine Dupri asked him to become the head of marketing at his label, So So Def, Braun dropped out of college before completing his degree.

Career
Braun began organizing parties while studying at Emory University. In 2002, Braun was hired to plan after-parties in each of the five cities on the Anger Management Tour, featuring Ludacris and Eminem. This launch into the world of hip-hop led Braun to meet Jermaine Dupri, the director of So So Def Records. Braun was 19 years old when Dupri asked him to join So So Def in a marketing position, and 20 when Dupri named him So So Def's executive director for marketing. Some of his larger events included parties for the 2003 NBA All-Star Game and after-parties on Britney Spears' Onyx Hotel Tour. Braun left So So Def. He started his own marketing business by brokering a $12 million campaign deal between Ludacris and Pontiac; the music video for Ludacris' "Two Miles an Hour" featured a Pontiac while Pontiac's commercials featured the song.

Braun became involved with Justin Bieber and got his mother to bring her son to Atlanta for a no-strings-attached trial period. Eventually, Braun convinced them to move permanently from Canada to the United States. Both Usher and Justin Timberlake expressed interest, and in the end Bieber signed with Island Def Jam in partnership with Raymond-Braun Media Group (RBMG). Braun also signed Ariana Grande to his record label in 2013. Braun also managed the careers of Psy, Tori Kelly, Carly Rae Jepsen, Martin Garrix, Kanye West, Black Eyed Peas, David Guetta, Lil Dicky and others. Braun assembled the biggest music-management company by acquiring half of the management companies of Jason Owens’ Sandbox Entertainment, Morris Higham, Brandon Creed, Troy Carter, and a partnership with Adel “Future the Prince” Nur and Drake.

Film and television
Braun produced Never Say Never, a documentary about Bieber that MTV reported in 2011 as "one of the highest grossing music documentaries in domestic box-office history". The film's budget was $13 million and earned over $100 million worldwide. Braun was the executive producer of Burden, Demi Lovato: Dancing with the Devil, The Giver, The Boy from Medellin, and Project Runway among others. Braun was also an executive producer for the CBS drama Scorpion, which aired from 2014 until 2018. In 2018, Variety reported that FX had ordered a pilot of Dave, a comedy executive-produced by Braun that included actor Kevin Hart and rapper Lil Dicky. In its first season, Dave was the most-watched show in FX history. In July 2019, his company SB Projects agreed to a first-look deal with Amazon Studios that included television and film scripts.

SB Projects
In 2007 Braun established SB Projects, an entertainment and marketing company encompassing a range of ventures including Schoolboy Records, SB Management, and Sheba Publishing, a songwriting firm. The group also included RBMG, a joint venture between Braun and Usher. School Boy Records had a music distribution arrangement with Universal Music Group. In early 2013 Ariana Grande was signed to Braun's management and in 2016, Grande's label, Republic Records confirmed that Braun served as her main manager handling all aspects of her career. SB Ventures also handled television campaigns, branding, music-licensing deals, and tour sponsorships—including Bieber's Calvin Klein endorsement for the 2016-2017 Purpose World Tour. The company also brokered a partnership between Kanye West and sneaker brand, Adidas. More recently, it has a first look deal with Amazon.

Ithaca Holdings
Ithaca Holdings, Braun's holding company that includes SB Projects, raised $120 million in 2010 for venture capital including investments in Uber, Spotify and Editorialist. Media outlets reported that Ithaca, with $500 million under management as of 2018, would back GoodStory Entertainment, a collaboration between Braun and entertainment executive J. D. Roth, in acquisitions for unscripted, live event, and documentary films.

In June 2019, Ithaca acquired Big Machine Label Group in a purchase that included the masters to the first six albums of singer-songwriter Taylor Swift. The acquisition was financed by The Carlyle Group and several other private equity firms. Its founder Scott Borchetta remains with the company as CEO as a minority shareholder in Ithaca. In 2020, Ithaca Holdings sold the six-album masters to Shamrock Holdings for a reported $405 million.

In April 2021, South Korean company Hybe announced that it would acquire Ithaca Holdings from Braun and Carlyle via the subsidiary Hybe America in a deal estimated to be around $1.05 billion. As part of the sale, Braun would become Hybe America's CEO and join Hybe's board of directors. On May 31, 2022, Braun visited with BTS and US President Joe Biden at the White House to discuss the recent rise in anti-Asian hate crimes. 

In 2023, Hybe acquired Quality Control Music for $300 million, with Kevin “Coach K” Lee and Pierre “P” Thomas maintaining control of the label under Braun.

Dispute with Taylor Swift

In June 2019, Ithaca acquired the masters to the first six studio albums by Taylor Swift under the acquisition of Big Machine Records, Swift's record company until 2019. She condemned Ithaca's purchase and Big Machine's former president, Scott Borchetta, said that Swift declined an opportunity to buy the masters and challenged Swift's claims.

Swift re-recorded her first six studio albums she alleged that Big Machine blocked her from using old material for the American Music Awards of 2019 and the documentary Miss Americana (2020), as well as a release of Live from Clear Channel Stripped 2008 in 2020.

Mythos Studios
In 2018, The New York Times reported that Braun had joined David Maisel, founding chairman of Marvel Studios to form Mythos Studios to produce comic book movie franchises in live-action and animated formats.

Investments 
A prolific investor, Braun is a partner in TQ Ventures. Braun was an early investor in Uber, Spotify, Waze, DropBox, Pinterest, Lyft, Ro, Noom, Liquid I.V., among others.

Awards
In 2012, Braun was awarded an ACLU Bill of Rights award.
In 2013, Braun was included in the annual Time 100 list of the most influential people in the world. He also appeared a second time on the cover of Billboard in its April 20, 2013, issue, alongside Guy Oseary and Troy Carter. In 2016 Scooter won the award for "Best Talent Manager" at the 3rd annual "International Music Industry Awards" presented by Shazam at the 12th annual MUSEXPO in Los Angeles.

Braun was nominated as a producer and writer for two Grammy Awards, in 2017 and 2022. In 2017, Braun appeared on the cover of both, Variety magazine's Hitmakers issue and Success magazine's Gratitude issue.

In 2018, Braun was honored with the Music Biz 2018 Harry Chapin Memorial Humanitarian Award for his philanthropic efforts in 2017. He also received the  Save the Children's Humanitarian Award that year.

ln 2019 he was inducted to the Midem Hall of Fame. In 2020, Fortune named him in its "40 Under 40" list in media and entertainment. In 2021, Braun was named Variety magazine's "Music Mogul of the Year."

Politics
Braun hosted a fundraiser for Hillary Clinton at his home in 2015. In 2019, he hosted a fundraiser for the Kamala Harris 2020 presidential campaign.  He supported developer Rick Caruso in the 2022 Los Angeles mayoral election.

Philanthropy
Braun is involved in various charities including the Braun Family Foundation. He also assists with his brother Adam's charity, Pencils of Promise. Billboard reported that as of 2017, Scooter Braun—along with clients and his companies—have granted more wishes for the Make-A-Wish Foundation than any other organization in the history of the foundation. Braun was honored with the Humanitarian Award at the 2016 Billboard Touring Awards for his philanthropic support of Pencils of Promise, the Make-A-Wish Foundation, and Fuck Cancer. In 2017, Braun was an organizer behind “Hand in Hand” a telethon that raised $55 million for relief from Hurricane Harvey and Irma.

Braun coordinated a charity single, "Stuck With U", by Justin Bieber and Ariana Grande to raise money to mitigate the COVID-19 pandemic. All net proceeds from the song went to the First Responders Children's Foundation to fund grants and scholarships for children of first responders and health care workers who worked on the front lines during the pandemic.

Personal life
In 2013, Braun began dating Yael Cohen. The couple wed on July 6, 2014, in Whistler, British Columbia, Canada, at Cohen's parents' house. They had a son in 2015, another son in 2016, and a daughter in 2018. Braun filed for divorce on 21 July 2021.

Filmography

References

External links 

Braun interview with Complex magazine

1981 births
Living people
21st-century American businesspeople
American chairpersons of corporations
American chief executives
American consulting businesspeople
American marketing businesspeople
American mass media company founders
American media executives
American music industry executives
American music managers
American music publishers (people)
American nonprofit businesspeople
American people of Hungarian-Jewish descent
American talent agents
Businesspeople from Greenwich, Connecticut
Businesspeople from New York City
Emory Eagles men's basketball players
Jewish American philanthropists
People from Cos Cob, Connecticut
Schoolboy Records
Philanthropists from New York (state)
Greenwich High School alumni
21st-century American Jews